Psilorhynchus piperatus is a freshwater ray-finned fish, from the Man Chaung, Ayeyarwaddy River drainage in Myanmar.

References

piperatus
Fish of Asia
Fish of Myanmar
Taxa named by Kevin W. Conway
Taxa named by Ralf Britz
Fish described in 2010